Braxton Cain Thomas Davidson (born June 18, 1996) is an American professional baseball outfielder who is currently a free agent.

Career

Atlanta Braves
Davidson attended T. C. Roberson High School in Asheville, North Carolina. He was drafted by the Atlanta Braves in the first round of the 2014 Major League Baseball draft. He signed with Atlanta, forgoing his commitment to play college baseball at the University of North Carolina.

Davidson spent his first professional season with both the GCL Braves and the Danville Braves, batting a combined .224 with 11 RBIs in fifty games between the two teams. He spent the 2015 season with the Rome Braves where he hit .242 with ten home runs and 45 RBIs, in 124 games. After spending time in major league spring training, Davidson was assigned to the Carolina Mudcats to start 2016. He spent the whole 2016 season with the Mudcats where he posted a .224 batting average with ten home runs and 63 RBIs in 128 games. Davidson spent 2017 with the Florida Fire Frogs where he batted .213 with seven home runs and 36 RBIs in 111 games, and he returned to the Fire Frogs in 2018, slashing .171/.281/.365 with twenty home runs and 64 RBIs in 121 games. After the 2018 season, he was assigned to the Peoria Javelinas of the Arizona Fall League.

Davidson missed all of 2019 due to injury. He was released from the Braves organization on May 28, 2020.

Team Texas
In July 2020, Davidson signed on to play for Team Texas of the Constellation Energy League (a makeshift 4-team independent league created as a result of the COVID-19 pandemic) for the 2020 season.

Joliet Slammers
On March 18, 2021, Davidson signed with the Joliet Slammers of the Frontier League.

Schaumburg Boomers
On August 10, 2021, Davidson was traded to the Schaumburg Boomers of the Frontier League. On January 5, 2022, Davidson was released by the Boomers. On April 13, 2022, Davidson signed with the Boomers once again for the 2022 season. Davidson did not re-sign with the Boomers for the 2023 season.

Personal
Davidson's parents are Cecil Davidson and Tanya Caldwell.

References

External links

1996 births
Living people
Sportspeople from Asheville, North Carolina
Baseball outfielders
Gulf Coast Braves players
Danville Braves players
Peoria Javelinas players
Carolina Mudcats players
Florida Fire Frogs players
Baseball players from North Carolina